Sarjun KM is an Indian film director and writer who works in the Tamil cinema industry. He began his career, by directing short films like Smiley, Thuyil, and a few others. He gained popularity after the release of his short film Lakshmi released on 1 November 2017. The short film Lakshmi gained popularity for its bold storyline and received international acclaim. He made his directorial feature film debut with Echcharikkai – Idhu Manidhargal Nadamaadum Idam (2018). The film was released on 24 August 2018. Sarjun's another short film Maa got released on 25 January 2018.

Career

2011-2016

Kadal
Sarjun worked as an associate director with Mani_Ratnam in the movie kadal Kadal_(2013_film).

Kaththi
Sarjun worked as an associate director with AR_Murugadoss as associate director in the movie Kaththi in the year 2014.

O Kadhal Kanmani
Sarjun continued to work with Mani_Ratnam as associate director in the movie O_Kadhal_Kanmani in the post production.

2017-2019

Lakshmi
Sarjun's career was launched after the release of his first independent short film Lakshmi (2017 film). The film was written, edited and directed by Sarjun KM, and was produced by Big Print Pictures. The film cast Lakshmi Priyaa Chandramouli in the lead role along with Nandan and Leo Sivadass in supporting characters. The cinematography department was handled by Sudarshan Srinivasan and the background score and music was composed by Sundaramurthy KS. The film was distributed by Gautham Vasudev Menon through his official YouTube channel of the film production company Ondraga Entertainment on 1 November 2017. The film was critically acclaimed for the direction, but faced criticism for its storyline, which gained popularity among the general audience and media.

Echcharikkai- Idhu Manidhargal Nadamaadum Idam
Sarjun came out with his first Tamil crime Thriller(genre) feature film Echcharikkai, which was written and directed by him. The film got released on 24 August 2018. The film featured actors Sathyaraj, Varalaxmi Sarathkumar, Kishore (actor, born 1974), Yogi Babu and Vivek Rajgopal. The first schedule of the film was shot in Pondicherry and the third schedule was shot in North Chennai. The trailer of the film was launched by Actors R. Madhavan and Vijay Sethupathi.

Maa
In 2018, he directed his next short film Maa (2018 film) under the banner of Ondraga Entertainment, owned by director Gautham Vasudev Menon. Maa also received positive reviews.

Airaa
Sarjun's next feature film project, Airaa released on 28 March 2019. The horror(genre) film revolves around a female protagonist played by Nayanthara.
It also cast Kalaiyarasan and Yogi Babu in lead roles. For the first time actress Nayanthara played a dual role - Vlogger Yamuna and village girl Bhavani. 
The film was produced by KJR Studios, which also produced Nayanthara's film Aramm. The music for the film was composed by Sundaramurthy KS and lyrics were written by lyricists Yugabharathi, Pa. Vijay, and Thamarai. Sudarshan Srinivasan (cinematographer) and Karthik Jogesh (film editor) who were in long-term collaboration with director Sarjun KM in his previous film have also worked on this project.

2019-2022

Addham

Sarjun directed the episode The Road That Never Ends in the three-episode anthology addham. The story revolves around a lorry driver played by actor Jayaprakash and a teenage boy who tries to steal the money owned by the lorry driver.

Navarasa
Sarjun directed the Navarasa (web series) - A Tamil anthology web series, starring Atharvaa and Anjali_(actress) which is released in Netflix.

Ponniyin Selvan

Sarjun worked as associate director in the movie Ponniyin_Selvan:_I directed by mani_ratnam.

Filmography

References

Living people
Tamil film directors
Tamil screenwriters
Film directors from Chennai
1986 births